Shark Bait (The Reef: Shark Bait in the UK, Australia and North America, Pi's Story in South Korea) is a 2006 computer animated adventure film. The plot revolves around Pi and his attempt to win the heart of Cordelia while dealing with a tiger shark that is terrorizing him and the reef's inhabitants.

A critical and commercial failure, the film was panned. Although several well-known actors and comedians were involved in the voiceover work, the film was a box-office bomb. Despite being an American-South Korean co-production, the movie did not receive a theatrical release in the United States. Instead it was released direct to DVD in 2007.

A direct-to-DVD sequel, The Reef 2: High Tide was released in 2012.

Plot

Pisces, or Pi, is a young orange wrasse living with his parents Pike and Piper in the polluted harbor of Boston, Massachusetts, until a fishing boat scoops them from the sea. Pi's parents help him escape the net, but cannot escape themselves. Before they are taken away, Piper tells Pi to promise her he would go live with his aunt Pearl. Pi's porpoise friend Percy and Percy's mother Meg agree to take him, but Pi refuses to leave in case his parents return. Meg tells him once anyone is taken by a net they are killed. Pi is heartbroken that his parents are gone forever.

Meg and Percy take Pi to live with his aunt Pearl on an exotic reef. The first residents Pi comes across are three elderly marlin named Moe, Jack, and Manny, which direct him towards Pearl's home. On his way there, Pi immediately falls in love with Cordelia, a beautiful angelfish model that has appeared on the cover of National Geographic. He also meets his cousin Dylan, who quickly becomes Pi's best friend. However, Pi soon encounters Troy, the meanest, toughest tiger shark in the ocean, who is not only terrorizing everyone in the reef community, but also has his eye set on Cordelia to become his mate. Pi confronts Troy, only to be physically assaulted by him. Cordelia tells Pi that the only dangerous place on the reef is between Troy and whatever he wants, and if Pi wishes to help her he won’t interfere. Pi and Dylan find their way home, where Pearl is excited to see that Pi has arrived. She is a fortune teller along with her assistant Madge, a sea star and uses a pink pearl that Dylan's late father gave to her as a crystal ball. Pearl reads Pi's future and sees that he is destined for great things and that he will find his destiny on the reef. Pearl then tells Pi that he can go anywhere excluding an old pirate wreck and a forbidden place called "flat bottom". Pearl leaves Dylan in charge of showing Pi around. Dylan tells Pi about Nerissa, a wise old hermit loggerhead turtle that lives in an abandoned shipwreck and practices martial arts, leading to rumors that he is a wizard. Eventually they stumble upon flat bottom, the open sea which is outside of the wildlife sanctuary free for humans to come with their fishing nets.

Dylan leaves after a close encounter and Pi sees Cordelia, but per her instructions does not interact until he hears her scream after getting a lure stuck in her fin and swears to help her. Pi brings Cordelia to a crab and sawfish duo named Buddy and Lou who successfully remove it, afterwards she invites him to go to a concert with her. Beforehand, Pi meets Dylan once again and they observe Nerissa defend his blue pearl.

At the amphitheatre that night with Cordelia, Pi learns about the performer Thornton, a harbor seal that fought a large monster. Afterwards, Pi and Cordelia look at the stars and she falls in love with him. Suddenly, Troy arrives and pursues them. Pi refuses to leave Cordelia, but Troy starts abusing him worse than ever, until Cordelia makes a deal with him: if he leaves Pi alone, she will marry Troy, Pi is knocked unconscious by Troy and is carried to Nerissa's shipwreck by a current.

When Nerissa tells Pi the following day, he is fed up with Troy's abuse towards him, and asks Nerissa to teach him the ways of the ocean to combat Troy. Nerissa initially refuses, Pi asks other residents to help him, but the marlins think because of their age, they won't be useful, also revealing they used to be friends of Nerissa's. Thornton also refuses until Pi reminds Thornton of his tale. However, he states that he didn't actually fight a monster, but due to his "poetic license" it didn’t count as lying.

Meanwhile, Troy's henchmen Bart and Eddie try to steal Nerissa's pearl, but are frightened away by Pi and Dylan. Nerissa arrives and is impressed with Pi's skills, agreeing to train him the next morning.

On Pi's first day of training, Pearl is worried, telling Pi that she could not live with herself if he were killed. Pi reminds his aunt how she told him he would find his destiny on the reef, and he did when he met Cordelia and now he’s losing her like he lost his parents. Pi reminds Pearl how he couldn't do anything to save them, but he still has a chance to save Cordelia.

Nerissa leads Pi down a valley with obstacles.

Meanwhile, Cordelia is informed by Buddy and Lou about Pi's upcoming battle with Troy. Nerissa reveals the story of his blue pearl to Pi and he gave it to his wife, but she got hooked in the open sea and taken away to a wildlife sanctuary. Nerissa desperately begged for help, but no one was brave enough. Pi understands, but is unsure how to stop Troy for good; Nerissa tells Pi that Troy has never learned about anything larger than himself, stating the ocean itself is bigger than Troy and if Pi can use the ocean against him, his size wouldn't matter.

Cordelia finds Pi and tries to convince him to reconsider, willing to sacrifice herself for his life. That night Pearl's pearl has been stolen by Troy's henchmen. She is heartbroken, since it was all she had left of her late husband. Pi realizes that he cannot back down now no matter how much everyone else doubts him.

When Troy returns to the reef, Pi initiates a chase with Troy through the valley Nerissa instructed him to take. Nerissa tries to help by disabling Bart and Eddie and Dylan shoves them down a lobster hole, retrieving his mother's pearl in the process. Pi is then swatted by Troy's tail into a cliff, burying him in rocks. Nerissa attempts to help him, but is hit by Troy; just as all seems lost Thornton and the marlins arrive to fight Troy and they apologize to Nerissa for not helping him when he needed them.

Percy and Meg return and free Pi. Troy then sets Percy as a target. Pi sees a net and plans to trick Troy into it. Troy believes Pi is doomed since they are now in his domain. Troy chases Pi up to the surface, where he manages to lead Troy into a fishing net and narrowly escapes the shark's jaws. A screaming Troy, trapped in the net, begs for his life as the fishermen lift him out of the sea.

Pi is proclaimed a hero by the population of the reef who all mock Troy believing that he will be made into seafood. Nerissa admits he sees Pi as his son and gives him his pearl. Pi presents Cordelia with the pearl and she accepts it, they share a kiss as the reef celebrates, including a redeemed Bart and Eddie, who rejoice that they are all free from Troy.

In the mid-credits scene, Thornton tells Pi's story to everyone on the reef, proud now that he can tell a true story about himself ending with "Pi was determined, he refused to despair, I know it's all true, for you see, I was there..."

Voice cast

English dub 
 Freddie Prinze, Jr. as Pi (Pisces), an orange male wrasse fish that was orphaned when his parents were caught in a fishing net. 
 Jimmy Bennett plays Young Pi.
 Evan Rachel Wood as Cordelia, a carnation pink female angelfish model for National Geographic and Pi's love interest.
 Rob Schneider as Nerissa, an old widowed hermit green loggerhead sea turtle and Pi's mentor.
 Schneider also voices Bart and Eddie, Troy's henchmen, Bart is a smart, sophisticated barracuda, while Eddie is a dimwitted wolf eel. Schneider also voices other characters like a conch shell, an Indian crab, a lobster, Lou, Madge the Sea Star, and a pelican.
 Donal Logue as Troy, a tiger shark and the film's main antagonist, that terrorizes the entire population of the reef. He is Pi's nemesis.
 Andy Dick as Dylan, a teal Elongate surgeonfish and Pi's cousin.
 Fran Drescher as Aunt Pearl, a purple Elongate surgeonfish who is Dylan's mother & Pi's maternal aunt. She is a fortune teller and has a sea star assistant named Madge.
 John Rhys-Davies as Thornton, an elderly harbor seal who is very poetic.
 R. Lee Ermey as Jack an overweight marlin.
 Richard Epcar as Moe, an elderly marlin.
 Mel Rodriguez as Manny, a Spanish marlin.
 David Fickas as Max, a decorator crab who is Cordelia's boss with a French accent.
 Trent Ford as Percy, a harbour porpoise who is Pi's adoptive brother.
 Dylan Cash plays Young Percy.
 Megahn Perry as Meg, Percy's mother and Pi's surrogate mother.
 Lena Gleen as Buddy, a flamboyant fiddler crab and Lou's boss.
 Joel Michaely as Lou, a sawfish and Buddy's assistant.
 Bruno Alexander as Pike, Pi's deceased father.
 Reedy Gibbs as Piper, Pi's deceased mother.

South Korean cast 
 Kim Hyung-jun as Pisces ("Pi")
 Im Chae-moo as Nerissa
 Park Myeong-su as Troy
 Kim Kyu-jong as Dylan
 Kim Hyun-joong as a crab
 Park Jung-min as Percy

Reception
The film was panned by critics, and was deemed a rip-off of DreamWorks' Shark Tale and Pixar's Finding Nemo as it heavily borrows from both films along with The Little Mermaid. Its animation was also deemed poor and outdated.

On Rotten Tomatoes it has 4 reviews, 3 negative, and 1 positive.

eFilmCritic.com's David Cornelius described it as "undoubtedly one of the cheapest, ugliest cartoon features ever produced", criticizing its CGI, graphics, and animation. He also criticized its plot, saying, "the script also rehashes every conceivable cliche the kid flick book".

Vince Leo from Qwipster's Movie Reviews gave the movie 2 out of 5 stars, saying, "Shark Bait (aka The Reef in some markets) certainly is testing the limits. It's easily the worst CG-animated adventure to date (up to 2007), burdened with lame puns...". He criticized the animation, calling the character designs "lackluster" and the background "overly simplistic".

Louise Keller of Urban Cinefile gave the film a positive review, saying "The Reef" (the alternative title used in some regions) was a much better title than "Shark Bait" and that it was a "colourful and family friendly animated ocean tale".

Crew
 Richard Epcar – voice director

References

External links

 
 
 Shark Bait at HanCinema
 Time Out film review

2006 films
2000s children's animated films
2006 computer-animated films
2000s American animated films
2000s Korean-language films
South Korean animated films
Films about sharks
Animated films about fish
Animated films about orphans
Films scored by Christopher Lennertz
Mockbuster films
2000s South Korean films